The Impossible Mr. Pipelet, is a French comedy drama film from 1955, directed by André Hunebelle, written by Jacques Gut, starring Michel Simon and Louis de Funès. The film is known under the titles "The Impossible Mr. Pipelet" (international English title), "Ma fille et ses amours" Belgium French title), "Mijn dochter is verliefd" (Belgium Flemish title).

Cast 
 Michel Simon : Maurice Martin
 Gaby Morlay : Germaine Martin, wife of Maurice
 Etchika Choureau : Jacqueline Martin, the single daughter of Maurice and Germaine
 Louis de Funès : Uncle Robert, the brother of Germaine and the husband of Mathilda
 Louis Velle : Georges Richet, the son of the owners and doctor-to-be
 Mischa Auer : the unsuccessful writer, a lodger
 Maurice Baquet : Jojo, the oldest son of Robert an Mathilde, the boxer
 Jean Brochard : Mr Richet, the businessman who owns the building
 Jean-Jacques Delbo : Mr Francis, Ms's Greta's pimp
 Jacques Dynam : Mr Durand, the father-to-be
 Georgette Anys : Aunt Mathilde, Robert's wife
 Renée Passeur : Miss Richet, the businessman's wife
 Jess Hahn : Jérome K. Smith, un Américain lodger
 Dominique Maurin : Dédé, the youngest son of Robert an Mathilde
 Nicky Voillard : Miss Greta, a lodger in the 5th stock
 Jacqueline Gut : Misses Smith, Jérôme's wife
 Christiane Chambord : Myriam
 Noël Roquevert : the retired colonel, a lodger
 Benoîte Lab : the innkeeper
 Simone Bach : Jacqueline's friend
 Paul Azaïs : the caterer

References

External links 
 
 L’Impossible Monsieur Pipelet (1955) at the Films de France

1955 films
1955 comedy-drama films
French comedy-drama films
1950s French-language films
French black-and-white films
Films directed by André Hunebelle
Pathé films
1950s French films